Eduardo Dalbono (10 December 1841 – 23 August 1915) was an Italian painter born in Naples.

Biography
The son of a writer and art critic father and poet mother, Edoardo Dalbono attended the Royal Institute of Fine Arts in Naples in 1853, but left it shortly afterwards to join Nicola Palizzi’s studio. In 1859 he participated in Mostra di Belle Arti at the Real Museo Borbonico winning the silver medal; he then became interested in the Scuola di Resina, and his artistic research centred on life studies of nature. In 1867 he began showing his works regularly at the Società Promotrice di Belle Arti in Naples and other exhibitions; he won the silver medal at the National Exposition at the Accademia di Belle Arti di Parma in 1870 with a history painting and the bronze medal at the international exhibition in Vienna in 1873. From 1878 to 1888 he lived in Paris and, with the help of his friend Giuseppe De Nittis, entered into a contract with the art dealer Goupil. During this decade he returned to Italy several times, staying in Milan and Verona, and also continued the activity he had begun years earlier as an illustrator. He was one of the founders of the Società Napoletana degli Artisti, and later of the Circolo Artistico, and in 1897 was appointed professor of painting at the Naples Academy. He went on to show his works in the international exhibitions in Venice in 1895, St Louis in 1904 and Rome in 1911. He died in Naples in 1915.

Among his pupils was Carlo Brancaccio.

Works 
 Adelina e Eleonora - National Museum of Capodimonte
 La leggenda delle sirene - Galleria dell'Accademia di Belle Arti of Naples
 Pescatori di Napoli - Museu de Arte de São Paulo

Bibliography 
  Federigo Verdinois, I Dalbono, in Idem, Profili letterari napoletani, Morano, Naples 1882, pp. 99–106.
  A. Schettini, La Pittura napoletana dell'ottocento, Editrice  E.D.A.R.T. Naples 1967.
  M.A. Pavone, Napoli scomparsa nei dipinti di fine ottocento, Newton Compton Editori, Rome 1987.
  AAVV. Capolavori dell'800 Napoletano, dal romanticismo al verismo, Mazzotta, Milan 1997.
   Massimo Ricciardi, La costa d'Amalfi nella pittura dell'ottocento, De Luca editore Salerno 1998.
  Nello Ammendola, Saverio Ammendola, Ottocento-Novecento, due secoli di pittura a Napoli, con introduzione e intervista di M. Picone Petrusa, Electa Napoli, Napoli 1999.
  Achille della Ragione, Eduardo Dalbono: il pittore della luce, Naples 2011.

External links 
 Laura Casone, Eduardo Dalbono, online catalogue Artgate by Fondazione Cariplo, 2010, CC BY-SA (source for the first revision of this article).

Other projects

19th-century Italian painters
Italian male painters
20th-century Italian painters
Painters from Naples
1841 births
1915 deaths
Accademia di Belle Arti di Napoli alumni
19th-century Italian male artists
20th-century Italian male artists